Gary Lee Imhoff is an American actor. He was a teacher at Milton Katselas' Beverly Hills Playhouse. Imhoff teaches The Professional Artists Workshop and The Musical Artists Workshop at The Whitmore-Lindley Theatre in North Hollywood, California. Imhoff is probably best known for playing Curtis Estabrook on the TV series Falcon Crest and for providing the voice of Prince Cornelius in the Don Bluth film Thumbelina and Harry Osborn in the 1994 Spider-Man animated TV series.

He is a scientologist.

Television
Another Day (1978) - Peter Sloane (2 episodes)
The Runaways aka Operation Runaway (1978) - Danny (1 episode)
How The West Was Won (1979) - Lt. Barker (1 episode)
Taxi (1979) - Richard (1 episode)
Barney Miller (1979) - Joseph Hutton (1 episode)
The Waltons (1980) - Roland Piper (1 episode)
Eight Is Enough (1978–1981) - Dennis/Marshall Spector/Lance Ham/Henry (5 episodes)
The Powers of Matthew Star (1983) - Gary Wymore (1 episode) (episode "Quadrian Caper")
Defenders of the Earth (voice) (1986) - Ajuna (1 episode)
Throb (1987) - Quentin (1 episode)
What a Country (1987) - Vladimir Kirov (1 episode)
Falcon Crest (1987–1988) - Curtis Estabrook (8 episodes)
Timon And Pumbaa (voice) (1995) - Singing Frogs (1 episode)
Life... and Stuff aka Life & Stuff (1997) - Maurice (1 episode)
Spider-Man (voice) (1995–1998) - Harry Osborn/Green Goblin II (23 episodes)
Beyond Belief: Fact or Fiction (1997–1998) - The Technician (2 episodes)
Buffy the Vampire Slayer (1998) - Teacher (1 episode)
L.A. Heat (1999) - (Uncredited Role) (1 episode)
Monk (2003) - Umpire (1 episode)
Carnivàle (2003) - Male Performer (1 episode)
The Suite Life of Zack & Cody (2007) - Dr. Fred Zippinpickle (1 episode) (episode "Tiptonline")

Filmography
 The Seniors (1978) - Ben
 Zuma Beach (1978) - Frank
 Lucy Moves to NBC (1980) - Fred Silverman
 The Nude Bomb (1980) - Jerry Krovney
 It Came Upon the Midnight Clear (1984) - Freddie
 Summer School (1987) - Student
 Thumbelina (1994) - Prince Cornelius (voice)
 Spider-Man: Sins of the Fathers (1996) - The Green Goblin II (Harry Osborne) (voice)
 Rage (1996) - McKinna
 Skyscraper (1996) - Dudley
 Angel in Training (1999) - Cameron
 The Green Mile (1999) - Husband At Del's Execution
 The Date (2002/1) - George Hackett
 The Wager (2004) - Babayama
 Blood Brothers: Reign of Terror (2007) - SWAT Team
 Queen of the Lot (2010) - DB Client #8 (uncredited)
 The M Word (2014) - Lloyd Duff - TV Director

References

External links

Gary Imhoff at Hollywood.com

Living people
American male voice actors
American male television actors
American male film actors
Male actors from Massachusetts
American Scientologists
Male actors from Milwaukee
20th-century American male actors
21st-century American male actors
Year of birth missing (living people)